MTTD may refer to:
 MT-TD, or mitochondrially encoded tRNA aspartic acid, a type of transfer RNA in human biology 
 Motor Transport and Traffic Directorate, an agency of the Ghana Police Service
 Mean time to detection, a statistic in reliability engineering
 Medium Tactical Truck Demonstrator, a variant in the U.S. Army Family of Medium Tactical Vehicles